The new Town Hall is a former technical college in Library Street, Wigan, England which was converted into a municipal facility in 1990. It is a Grade II listed building.

History
The building, which was designed by Briggs and Wolstenholme in the Baroque style, was opened by the Countess of Crawford as the Wigan Mining and Technical College in 1903. The design included a porch with large Ionic order columns and frieze above with the words "Mining Technical College". The design also included four turrets with cupolas at roof level. An extension was added in 1929. After expanding into new areas such as building and the arts, the college became known as Wigan College of Technology. The college needed larger premises to accommodate this expansion and secured new facilities in Walkden Avenue in 1990. This enabled the vacated building in Library Street to be converted into a municipal facility to replace the aging old Town Hall at the corner of King Street and Rodney Street. The newly-converted facility was officially opened as the new headquarters of the Wigan Metropolitan Borough Council by the Princess of Wales on 25 November 1991. She unveiled a commemorative plaque and then had lunch with civic leaders.

In late 2008, the red terracotta facade was carefully repaired to stop pieces from breaking away. Then, a more extensive restoration of the town hall, to a design by GT3 Architects and undertaken by ISG Construction at a cost of £7.2 million, was completed in 2016. The restoration work involved changes to the interior layout to create an open-plan environment: it also included removal of ceilings to reveal original cornices, conservation of the original flooring and repairs to decorative tiling. During the work the contractors discovered a hidden network of tunnels, thought to be part of a heating system, as well an ornate mosaic floor and an antique stained glass window.

Important works of art in the town hall include a painting by George Earl depicting Victorians departing by train from King's Cross Station on a journey to Scotland. One of the function rooms displays copies of ten Royal charters that the town has received since it was granted borough status in 1246.

See also

Listed buildings in Wigan

References

Notes

Citations

Grade II listed buildings in the Metropolitan Borough of Wigan
City and town halls in Greater Manchester
Government buildings completed in 1903
1903 establishments in England